Salvia campanulata is a perennial plant that is native to Xizang and Yunnan provinces in China, along with locations in Bhutan, India (Sikkim), Myanmar, and Nepal. It is typically found growing at  elevation in and around forests, on hillsides, and in valleys. There are four named varieties.

The named varieties are due to differences in leaf hairs and texture, and differences in the bract and calyx:
Salvia campanulata var. campanulata
Salvia campanulata var. codonantha
Salvia campanulata var. fissa
Salvia campanulata var. hirtella

References

campanulata
Flora of China